Scaloposaurus is an extinct genus of carnivorous therocephalians living during the Permian 259.0—254.0 Ma existing for approximately .

Taxonomy
Scaloposaurus was named by Owen (1876). It was assigned to Therocephalia by Broom (1913); and to Scaloposauridae by Carroll (1988).

See also
 List of therapsids

References

Baurioids
Therocephalia genera
Lopingian synapsids of Africa
Fossil taxa described in 1876
Taxa named by Richard Owen